Cloudveil Dome is located in the Teton Range, Grand Teton National Park, Wyoming, immediately southeast of Grand Teton. The peak is in the central portions of the range, immediately east of South Teton and is sometimes considered to be part of what is collectively known as the Cathedral Group. Cloudveil Dome rises to the south of Garnet Canyon. The peak has a variety of mountaineering routes that are often overlooked since more popular climbing zones are nearby.

References

Mountains of Grand Teton National Park
Mountains of Wyoming
Mountains of Teton County, Wyoming